Tommy Smith or Tommie Smith may refer to:


Sports

Football
 Tommy L. Smith (1914–1985), Australian rules footballer
 Tommy Smith (footballer, born 1945) (1945–2019), English former international footballer, spent much of his career with Liverpool
 Tommy Smith (footballer, born 1959), English former footballer
 Tommy Smith (footballer, born 1980), English former footballer, most notably for Watford
 Tommy Smith (footballer, born 1990), New Zealand international footballer for Colchester United
 Tommy Smith (footballer, born 1992), English footballer for Middlesbrough
 Tommy Smith (footballer, born 2001), English footballer for Ipswich Town
 Tommy Smith (rugby union), 1978 rugby union winger for the USA national rugby squad, the American Cougars

Other sports
 Tommie Smith (born 1944), American track & field athlete, noted for Black Power salute at 1968 Olympics
 Tommy Smith (baseball) (born 1948), American baseball outfielder
 Tommy Smith (basketball) (born 1980), American basketball player
 Tommy Smith (ice hockey) (1886–1966), Canadian ice hockey forward
 Tommy Smith (jockey) (1937–2013), American jockey
 Tommy J. Smith (1916–1998), Australian trainer of racehorses
 Tommy Smith (racing driver) (born 2002), Australian racing driver

Arts and entertainment
 Tommy Smith (playwright), American playwright
 Tommy Smith (DJ) (born 1954), radio disc jockey from Little Rock, Arkansas
 Tommy Smith (saxophonist) (born 1967), Scottish jazz saxophonist, composer and educator

See also
Thomas Smith (disambiguation)
Tom Smith (disambiguation)
Thomas Smyth (disambiguation)